Robert Woodhouse (born 23 June 1966) is an Australian former competition swimmer who specialised in medley swimming. He is now a prominent sports agent and company director.  Woodhouse and Brendon Smith are the only Australian men to have won an Olympic medal in an individual medley event. He was awarded the Australian Sports Medal in 2000.

Biography 
Woodhouse was educated at Melbourne's Scotch College, Swinburne University (BBus), and Victoria University (MBA).

Representing the Australian swimming team, he competed at the 1984 Summer Olympics in Los Angeles and the 1988 Summer Olympics in Seoul, as well as the Commonwealth Games in Brisbane (1982), Edinburgh (1986), and Auckland (1990).  He was an Australian Institute of Sport (AIS) scholarship holder. His sister Susie was also an AIS scholarship holder. He is also the uncle of Susie's children, David and Emma McKeon, who are also Olympic swimmers.

Sporting achievements 

 Bronze, 400 Metre Individual Medley, 1984 Los Angeles Olympics
 US National Champion 400m Individual Medley – 1984
 Silver, 200m Individual Medley, Pan Pacific Games, Tokyo – 1985
 Silver, 200 Metre Individual Medley, 1986 Commonwealth Games, Edinburgh
 Silver, 400 Metre Individual Medley, 1986 Commonwealth Games, Edinburgh
 Gold, 400 Metre Individual medley, 1987 World University Games, Zagreb
 Silver, 400 Metre Individual Medley, 1990 Commonwealth Games, Auckland
Woodhouse retired from swimming in 1990.
 Duke Kahanamoku Medal, Australian Monthly Swim 2019, Sydney

Business career 

Woodhouse set up his own sports management company in 1995. In the following years, he merged his business with the firm of former Collingwood football player Craig Kelly, forming Elite Sports Properties.

Elite Sports Properties became Australia's foremost sports management company, representing hundreds of top Australian Olympians, footballers and media personalities. The company established in Great Britain in 2008, representing a number of high-profile British Olympians including Sir Chris Hoy, Rebecca Adlington and Adam Peaty.  In 2015 the company was sold to TLA Worldwide.

Woodhouse has also appeared as part of various radio and television swimming commentary teams at swimming world championships (1998, 2007, 2009), Olympic Games (2004, 2008, 2012, 2016 and 2020), and Commonwealth Games (1994, 2006, 2010, 2014 and 2018).

Woodhouse served as the general manager for the swim club London Roar, a member of the International Swimming League, starting in 2019 and stopping in 2022 in part due to issues surrounding the non-payment of athletes. One of the swimmers of London Roar, Kyle Chalmers, publicly expressed gratitude for Woodhouse via the team website, saying, "I want to say a huge thank you to Rob for his tireless work over the past 3 seasons of ISL and his commitment to all the athletes involved with the London Roar. We couldn't have had the success and fantastic memories without you."

See also
 List of Commonwealth Games medallists in swimming (men)
 List of Olympic medalists in swimming (men)

References

External links
 Profile at www.sports-reference.com

1966 births
Living people
Australian male medley swimmers
Olympic swimmers of Australia
Swimmers at the 1984 Summer Olympics
Swimmers at the 1988 Summer Olympics
Swimmers at the 1986 Commonwealth Games
Swimmers at the 1990 Commonwealth Games
People educated at Scotch College, Melbourne
Olympic bronze medalists in swimming
Australian Institute of Sport swimmers
Australian sports agents
Australian businesspeople
Medalists at the 1984 Summer Olympics
Commonwealth Games silver medallists for Australia
Olympic bronze medalists for Australia
Commonwealth Games medallists in swimming
Universiade medalists in swimming
Universiade gold medalists for Australia
Universiade silver medalists for Australia
Medalists at the 1985 Summer Universiade
Medalists at the 1987 Summer Universiade
20th-century Australian people
21st-century Australian people
Medallists at the 1986 Commonwealth Games
Medallists at the 1990 Commonwealth Games